Jannes Vollert (born 21 January 1998) is a German professional footballer who plays as a centre back for Hallescher FC.

Career
In June 2013, Vollert joined Werder Bremen from Holstein Kiel.

During the 2017–18 season he became a regular starter for the club's reserves playing in the 3. Liga making 24 appearances. In June 2018, following the team's relegation, he agreed a contract extension.

On 5 June 2019, it was confirmed that Vollert had extended his contract with SV Werder Bremen until June 2022 and would be loaned out to 3. Liga club Hallescher FC until June 2021. In two seasons at Hallescher FC he made 54 league appearances scoring two goals.

In June 2021, Hallescher FC announced the permanent signing of Vollert for the 2021–22 season.

References

External links
 

1998 births
Living people
People from Rendsburg
German footballers
Footballers from Schleswig-Holstein
Association football midfielders
Germany youth international footballers
SV Werder Bremen II players
Hallescher FC players
3. Liga players